Karl Felix Wilhelm Sandman (born 25 October 1998) is a Swedish singer and actor. He is best known as a member of the boy band FO&O with two studio albums Off the Grid (2014) and FO&O (2017). He plays Sebastian Fagerman in the first Swedish Netflix original series Quicksand, which premiered on 5 April 2019.

Career 
In 2017, FO&O split, and Sandman launched a solo career. His first solo single "Every Single Day" peaked at number one on the Swedish singles chart. Sandman took part in Melodifestivalen 2018 with the song making it to the Second Chance round where Sandman and Mimi Werner duelled for a place in the final. Sandman won the duel qualifying to the Melodifestivalen 2018 final at Friends Arena. He finished in second place in the final. Sandman was the spokesperson for Sweden at the Eurovision Song Contest 2018. Later that year, he released his debut album Emotions and went on his first tour as a solo artist alongside friend and colleague Benjamin Ingrosso.

In 2018, Sandman was cast in the main role of Sebastian Fagerman on the Netflix crime drama Quicksand. The series is inspired by the novel of the same name written by Malin Persson Giolito and is the first Swedish produced original series for Netflix. The series premiered on 5 April 2019.

Also in 2019, Sandman was cast as Jonas in a Netflix comedy drama series Home for Christmas released in December 2019 this series was also Netflix's first Norwegian original series. It was renewed for a second series in 2020 also released in December.

In 2020, Sandman competed in Melodifestivalen 2020 with the song "Boys with Emotions", reaching the finale through the Second Chance round. He finished in seventh place, scoring a total of 67 points.

Discography

Albums

Singles

As lead artist

As featuring artist

Tours

Headlining 

Klubbturné (2019)

Co-headlining 

Turné 2018 (with Benjamin Ingrosso) (2018–2019)

Canceled concerts

Filmography 
Vi är bäst! (2013)
Quicksand  (2019)
Home for Christmas (Hjem til jul)  (2019–2020)

Awards and nominations

MTV Europe Music Awards 
The MTV Europe Music Awards was established in 1994 by MTV Europe to award the music videos from European and International artists.

!
|-
|2018
| Himself
|Best Swedish Act
|
|style="text-align:center;"|
|}

Rockbjörnen 
Rockbjörnen is a music prize in Sweden, divided into several categories, which is awarded annually by the newspaper Aftonbladet. The prize was first awarded in 1979, and is mostly centered on pop and rock.

!
|-
| rowspan="4"| 2018
| rowspan="2"| Himself
| Male Live Artist of the Year
| 
| style="text-align:center;" rowspan="4"| 
|-
| Breakthrough Artist of the Year
| 
|-
| "Every Single Day"
| Swedish Song of the Year
| 
|-
| Felix Sandman Fans
| Best Fans
| 
|-
| rowspan="3"| 2019
| rowspan="2"| Himself
| Male Live Artist of the Year
| 
| style="text-align:center;" rowspan="3"| 
|-
| Concert of the Year
| 
|-
| Felix Sandman Fans
| Best Fans
| 
|}

Notes

References

External links 

Official Twitter

Living people
1998 births
Swedish pop singers
Singers from Stockholm
Swedish songwriters
English-language singers from Sweden
Swedish singer-songwriters
21st-century Swedish singers
21st-century Swedish male singers
Male actors from Stockholm
Melodifestivalen contestants of 2020
Melodifestivalen contestants of 2018
Melodifestivalen contestants of 2017